"Today I Am a Clown" is the sixth episode of the fifteenth season of the American animated television series The Simpsons. It originally aired on the Fox network in the United States on December 7, 2003. The episode focuses on Krusty's religion, Judaism.

Dan Castellaneta won a Primetime Emmy Award for Outstanding Voice-Over Performance for his roles in this episode.

Plot
One morning, the family is visited by Dr. Hibbert, who says that Santa's Little Helper has impregnated his purebred poodle, Rosa Barks, and he gives the puppies to the Simpson family, making them their problem. Bart and Lisa give out the puppies to people, including Krusty the Clown, who takes his new puppy for a walk to his old neighborhood in the Jewish community of Springfield, where he sees the Jewish Walk of Fame. He finds out that he does not have a star on the sidewalk, and goes to register for one. However, when the person Krusty goes to asks for the date of his Bar Mitzvah, Krusty confesses that he never actually had a Bar Mitzvah. The person tells him that since he never had a Bar Mitzvah, he is not really Jewish. Krusty runs into Bart and Lisa outside, and he tells them of his problem. Bart and Lisa wonder how Krusty could not have had a Bar Mitzvah, especially considering that his own father is a rabbi. They go to Rabbi Hyman Krustofsky to ask why Krusty never had a Bar Mitzvah, and Hyman reveals that it was because he was afraid that Krusty would make a mockery of the whole ceremony. Lisa points out that Krusty can still have his Bar Mitzvah as an adult, as there is nothing in Judaism that forbids it. Hyman agrees to help his son reach his goal, teaching him all about Judaism. With this happening, Krusty cannot do shows on Saturdays (the Sabbath day for Jews); therefore, he must seek a replacement, and gets Homer to replace him for the day. Homer's replacement show is a talk show, which becomes a success in its own right; meanwhile, Krusty continues to learn his Jewish traditions.

In response to The Homer Simpson Shows surprising success, Krusty's show is eventually cancelled by Channel 6. Lisa suggests that Homer put his power to good use, but ratings decline and Homer's show is also cancelled thanks to Lisa's suggestion. Meanwhile, Krusty pitches his Bar Mitzvah to the Fox network. When the Bar Mitzvah ("Krusty the Klown's Wet 'n' Wild Bar Mitzvah"), featuring Mr. T as a guest, airs, it becomes a ratings smash, but the spectacle disappoints his father. Krusty feels guilty, and after the show, he holds a real Bar Mitzvah the traditional way at a Jewish temple.

Reception
In 2012, New York named "Today I Am a Clown" as one of the nine later Simpsons episodes that was as good as the show's classic era.

Joel H. Cohen was nominated for a Writers Guild of America Award for Outstanding Writing in Animation at the 57th Writers Guild of America Awards for his script to this episode.

References

External links

 
 An article on the episode in The Jewish Journal of Greater Los Angeles

The Simpsons (season 15) episodes
2003 American television episodes
Television episodes about Jews and Judaism
Jewish comedy and humor
Cultural depictions of Mr. T
Bar and bat mitzvah